25th Indiana Battery Light Artillery was an artillery battery that served in the Union Army during the American Civil War.

Service
The battery was organized at Indianapolis, Indiana September 4 through November 28, 1864, under the command of Captain Frederick C. Sturm.

The battery was attached to Artillery Brigade, IV Corps, Army of the Cumberland, to February 1865. Unattached Artillery, Department of the Cumberland, to March 1865. Garrison Artillery, Decatur, Alabama, to July 1865.

The 25th Indiana Battery Light Artillery mustered out of service on July 20, 1865, in Indianapolis.

Detailed service
Left Indiana for Nashville, Tennessee, November 28. Battle of Nashville, December 15–16, 1864. Pursuit of Hood to the Tennessee River December 17–28. Duty at Huntsville, Alabama, January 4 to February 3, 1865. Moved to Decatur, Alabama, February 3, and garrison duty there until July 11. Ordered to Indiana July 11.

Casualties
The battery lost a total of 7 enlisted men during service; 1 man killed and 6 men due to disease.

Commanders
 Captain Frederick C. Sturm

See also

 List of Indiana Civil War regiments
 Indiana in the Civil War

References
 Dyer, Frederick H. A Compendium of the War of the Rebellion (Des Moines, IA: Dyer Pub. Co.), 1908.
Attribution
 

Military units and formations established in 1864
Military units and formations disestablished in 1865
Units and formations of the Union Army from Indiana
1864 establishments in Indiana
Artillery units and formations of the American Civil War